Rud Kenar (also Romanized as Rūd Kenār; also known as Rud-Kinar) is a village in Dinachal Rural District, Pareh Sar District, Rezvanshahr County, Gilan Province, Iran. At the 2006 census, its population was 556, in 136 families.

References 

Populated places in Rezvanshahr County